The following squads and players competed in the men's handball tournament at the 1988 Summer Olympics.

Algeria
The following players represented Algeria:

 Makhlouf Aït Hocine
 Omar Azeb
 Ben Ali Beghouach
 Abdeslam Benmaghsoula
 Mahmoud Bouanik
 Salah Bouchekriou
 Abdelhak Bouhalissa
 Brahim Boudrali
 Mourad Boussebt
 Ahcene Djeffal
 Sofiane Draouci
 Fethnour Lacheheb
 Zineddine Mohamed Seghir
 Kamel Ouchia

Czechoslovakia
The following players represented Czechoslovakia:

 Miroslav Bajgar
 Michal Barda
 Tomáš Bártek
 Petr Baumruk
 Milan Brestovanský
 Karel Jindřichovský
 Jiří Kotrč
 Peter Mesiarik
 Jan Novák
 Jozef Škandík
 Libor Sovadina
 František Štika
 Zdeněk Vaněk
 Milan Folta

East Germany
The following players represented East Germany:

 Rüdiger Borchardt
 Jens Fiedler
 Mike Fuhrig
 Matthias Hahn
 Stephan Hauck
 Peter Hofmann
 Bernd Metzke
 Andreas Neitzel
 Peter Pysall
 Wieland Schmidt
 Holger Schneider
 Frank-Michael Wahl
 Holger Winselmann

Hungary
The following players represented Hungary:

 Imre Bíró
 József Bordás
 Ottó Csicsay
 János Fodor
 János Gyurka
 László Hoffmann
 Mihály Iváncsik
 Mihály Kovács
 Péter Kovács
 László Marosi
 Tibor Oross
 Jakab Sibalin
 László Szabó
 Géza Tóth

Iceland
The following players represented Iceland:

 Kristján Arason
 Alfreð Gíslason
 Guðmundur Guðmundsson
 Sigurður Gunnarsson
 Atli Hilmarsson
 Guðmundur Hrafnkelsson
 Brynjar Kvaran
 Þorgils Mathiesen
 Páll Ólafsson
 Bjarki Sigurðsson
 Jakob Sigurðsson
 Geir Sveinsson
 Sigurður Sveinsson
 Einar Þorvarðarson
 Karl Þráinsson

Japan
The following players represented Japan:

 Izumi Fujii
 Yukihiro Hashimoto
 Hidetada Ito
 Kazuhiro Miyashita
 Yoshihiko Nikawadori
 Kiyoshi Nishiyama
 Shinji Okuda
 Shinichi Shudo
 Koji Tachiki
 Takashi Taguchi
 Seiichi Takamura
 Kenji Tamamura
 Kodo Yamamoto
 Toshiyuki Yamamura
 Hiroshi Yanai

South Korea
The following players represented South Korea:

 Choi Suk-jae
 Kang Jae-won
 Kim Jae-hwan
 Koh Suk-chang
 Lee Sang-hyo
 Lim Jin-suk
 Noh Hyun-suk
 Oh Young-ki
 Park Do-hun
 Park Young-dae
 Shim Jae-hong
 Shin Young-suk
 Yoon Tae-il

Soviet Union
The following players represented the Soviet Union:

 Vyacheslav Atavin
 Igor Chumak
 Valeri Gopin
 Aleksandr Karshakevich
 Andrey Lavrov
 Yuri Nesterov
 Voldemaras Novickis
 Aleksandr Rymanov
 Konstantin Sharovarov
 Yuri Shevtsov
 Georgi Sviridenko
 Aleksandr Tuchkin
 Andrey Tyumentsev
 Mikhail Vasilev

Spain
The following players represented Spain:

 Juan Javier Cabanas
 Juan de la Puente
 Jesús Ángel Fernández
 Jaume Fort
 Jesús Gómez
 Ricardo Marín
 Juan Francisco Muñoz
 Jaime Puig
 Javier Reino
 Lorenzo Rico
 Julián Ruiz
 Joan Sagalés
 Eugenio Serrano
 Juan José Uría
 Miguel Ángel Zúñiga

Sweden
The following players represented Sweden:

 Per Carlén
 Per Carlsson
 Johan Eklund
 Mats Fransson
 Erik Hajas
 Claes Hellgren
 Peder Järphag
 Björn Jilsén
 Pär Jilsén
 Ola Lindgren
 Staffan Olsson
 Mats Olsson
 Sten Sjögren
 Magnus Wislander

United States
The following players represented the United States:

 James Buehning
 Scott Driggers
 Craig Fitschen
 Steven Goss
 Bob Hillary
 Boyd Janny
 Bryant Johnson
 William Kessler
 Stephen Kirk
 Peter Lash
 Joseph McVein
 Rod Oshita
 Joe Story
 Mike Sullivan

Yugoslavia
The following players represented Yugoslavia:

 Mirko Bašić
 Jožef Holpert
 Boris Jarak
 Slobodan Kuzmanovski
 Muhamed Memić
 Alvaro Načinović
 Goran Perkovac
 Zlatko Portner
 Iztok Puc
 Rolando Pušnik
 Momir Rnić
 Zlatko Saračević
 Irfan Smajlagić
 Ermin Velić
 Veselin Vujović

References

1988